Two Quixotes On Wheels (Dos quijotes sobre ruedas) is a 1966 Argentine film. It won many awards.

Cast
Directed by Emilio
Written by Abel Santacruz

Star actors:
Julio Aldama,
Alejandro Anderson,
Ricardo Bauleo

External links
 

1966 films
Argentine comedy films
1960s Spanish-language films
1960s Argentine films
Films directed by Emilio Vieyra